This is a list of countries with Jollibee franchises. This list only includes the Jollibee fast food chain brand of Jollibee Foods Corporation (JFC) and excludes other brands owned by the company.

As of November 2019, Jollibee operates at over 1,300 stores worldwide, 1,130 of which are in the Philippines, its country of origin, and 234 are situated in foreign markets.

As reported in a 1990 article in The Washington Times, Jollibee had two locations in Taiwan and one in the Brunei along with 58 locations in the Philippines.

According to a 1995 article in the Wall Street Journal, Jollibee had five locations in Brunei, two in Jakarta, Indonesia, and one in Dubai in the United Arab Emirates along with 160 locations in the Philippines.

By the end of 2011, Jollibee had 31 locations in Vietnam, 27 in the United States, 11 in Brunei, 7 in Saudi Arabia (all in Jeddah), and 1 each in Hong Kong and Qatar along with 747 locations in the Philippines.

Summary

Former branches

Planned locations

Europe
Jollibee had previously targeted opening a branch in Romania in 1995. In 2021, JFC is targeting to add 50 stores in Europe in the next five years.

Asia Pacific

Australia and Japan
In an October 2015 forum, Jollibee president and CEO Tony Tan Caktiong announced that Jollibee planned to open their first branches in Australia and Japan by 2017. In a signing ceremony on 26 October 2016, Caktiong said that Jollibee may open stores in Japan in 2018. within the same month JFC secured partnership with Ise Foods to open a Jollibee outlet in Japan. By October 2017, the projected dates of Jollibee's entrance into the two markets were pushed to 2020.

On 4 April 2022, it was reported that Jollibee will be opening its first Australian branch in Campbelltown a suburb of Sydney, New South Wales, with pre-construction plans already in progress.

Others
Jollibee has also considered reestablishing presence in Indonesia back in the late 2016 to mid-2017. Jollibee also considered reestablishing presence in China.

References

Jollibee
Jollibee
Jollibee